DX5 may refer to:

 Yamaha DX5 synthesizer, an electronic musical instrument
 DX5, an antibody which binds to CD49b antigens

DX5 is also the code name used by the main character "Macgyver"  in the long running television show "Macgyver"